Peter Allan (born 19 July 1975) is a professional rugby union referee who represented the Scottish Rugby Union.

Rugby union career

Playing career

Amateur career

Allan played as prop for Watsonians.

Referee career

Professional career

Allan won SRU referee of the year in 2005-06 season.

Allan refereed in the Celtic League.

He refereed his first 1872 Cup match on 2 January 2010.

He is now an Assistant Referee in the English Premiership.

International career

He was the fifth official in the Scotland v New Zealand match in the 2007 Rugby World Cup Pool C

References

Living people
Scottish rugby union referees
Rugby union officials
1975 births
1872 Cup referees
Watsonians RFC players